Islamic Centre for Development of Trade (ICDT;) is an intergovernmental organization and one of the seven subsidiary organs of the Organisation of Islamic Cooperation entrusted with the promotion of trade, economic development and commercial cooperation in public and private sectors across the 57 member states.

It plays a regular role in trade exchange and investment mechanism focused on economy promotion in the member states. It also maintains an environment support for its associated nations in obtaining access to global marketing, in addition to conducting negotiation with other international organisations, groups and enterprises in the field of trade.

History 
Headquartered in Casablanca, Morocco, Islamic Centre for Development of Trade establishment resolution was adopted by the Third Extraordinary Session of the Islamic Summit Conference in 1981. The approval session was held in Mecca, Saudi Arabia. It was formally launched as a subsidiary organ in 1984 from it founding location Casablanca, Morocco.

Investment 
The ICDT conducted several trade developments amounting $271.45 billion in 2005 which increased to $878 billion in 2015. The organisation, along with 57 member states made an investment of 223% of its total budget between 2005 and 2015. The United Arab Emirates ranks 1st in trade investment of $121.7 billion roughly equivalent to 15.2%, while Turkey has spent $77.8 billion roughly equivalent to 9.7%. Saudi Arabia has also contributed within the scope of organisation. It has made an investment of $74.3 billion, which is roughly equivalent 9.3%.

Countries associated with the Gulf Cooperation Council has made an investment of 35% collectively, while Asian countries has made 31% of investment. The Middle East countries has made a contribution of 24% while Sub-Saharan Africa contributed with 7%. The countries associated with the Arab Maghreb Union has made a contribution of 5% since its association with the ICDT.

Within the framework of its trade policy, it increases its investment from 18.7% in 2016 to 21.2% in 2018. The organisation witnessed a total increment of 13.5% between 2016 and 2018.

Later development 
In September 2021, a memorandum was signed by Expo Centre Sharjah, the Arab Federation for International Exhibitions and Conferences, the Council of Arab Economic Unity, and the Arab League for collaboration with the ICDT to maintain a single supportive environment in the field of trade developments and economic exhibitions across the 57 member states.

References

Further reading 
 

Organisation of Islamic Cooperation subsidiary organs
1984 establishments in Morocco
Trade unions established in 1984
Intergovernmental organizations
Advertising trade associations